Istra Parish is an administrative territorial entity of Ludza Municipality, Latvia.

Towns, villages and settlements of Istra Parish

References 

Parishes of Latvia
Ludza Municipality